San Ricardo, officially the Municipality of San Ricardo, is a 5th class municipality in the province of Southern Leyte, Philippines. According to the 2020 census, it has a population of 10,500 people.

Geography

Barangays
San Ricardo is politically subdivided into 15 barangays.
 Benit
 Bitoon
 Cabutan
 Camang
 Esperanza
 Pinut-an
 Poblacion (Santiago)
 San Antonio (Alangalang)
 San Ramon
 Saub
 Timba
 Esperanza Dos
 Kinachawa
 Inolinan
 Looc

Climate

Demographics

Economy

Transportation

Seaport 
San Ricardo Port or also known as Benit Port is a roro port that serves to and from Lipata Port, Surigao City, connects Pan-Philippine Highway also called Maharlika Highway AH26 that originates from Laoag to its southern terminus Zamboanga City. Montenegro Shipping Lines is the only primary ferry boat to serve Lipata Port and Benit Port.

Land 
San Ricardo also have bus terminal, named Benit Integrated Bus Terminal. It's serves from a local point including Manila and Davao. DLTBCo, Ultrabus, and CUL Transportation and other bus companies served from San Ricardo to Luzon. Bachelor Express also serve San Ricardo from Davao to Ormoc and Tacloban.

References

External links
 San Ricardo Profile at PhilAtlas.com
 [ Philippine Standard Geographic Code]
Philippine Census Information
Local Governance Performance Management System

Municipalities of Southern Leyte
Port cities and towns in the Philippines